Bonaval may refer to:

 Convent of San Domingos de Bonaval, a former Dominican monastery in Santiago de Compostela, Galicia, Spain
 Monastery of Bonaval, Retiendas, Spain
 Bernal de Bonaval (13th century), Galician troubadour

See also